MS Freedom of the Seas is a cruise ship operated by Royal Caribbean International. She is the namesake of Royal Caribbean's , and can accommodate 3,634 passengers and 1,300 crew  on fifteen passenger decks. The vessel also has 4 crew decks below the waterline. Freedom of the Seas was the largest passenger ship ever built (by gross tonnage) from 2006 until construction of her sister ship,  in 2007.

Construction

Freedom of the Seas is  narrower than QM2 at the waterline,  shorter, has  less draft, is  less tall and  slower. Freedom of the Seas however is the larger ship in terms of gross tonnage.

The ship has four bow thrusters.

Incidents

Fire
On July 22, 2015, a fire started in a mechanical area of the ship around 9:15 AM when the ship was en route from Cape Canaveral, Florida to Falmouth, Jamaica. All passengers were sent to their muster stations, and one crew member sustained first degree burns. The fire was extinguished after an hour and a half, and the ship was able to continue on its planned itinerary.

Death of Chloe Wiegand
On July 7, 2019, 18-month-old Chloe Wiegand died after falling through an open window on the 11th deck while the ship was docked in San Juan, Puerto Rico. Her 51-year-old grandfather, Salvatore Anello, had placed her on a railing and lost his grip while holding her. Anello claimed that he was colorblind and didn't notice that the window was open, but the cruise line released security camera footage that they claim shows Anello leaning out the window shortly before lifting the toddler up to it. On December 11, 2019, Chloe's parents sued Royal Caribbean Cruises Ltd. over the death of their daughter, alleging that the company was negligent for not properly securing the windows. Anello pled guilty to a charge of negligent homicide on February 25, and will be placed on probation.

Facilities

The ship has three swimming areas: an interactive water park, a dedicated adult pool, and the main pool.  Deck 13 has a sports area with a rock climbing wall, the FlowRider surf simulator, a miniature golf course and a full size basketball court. Other items include an ice skating rink, a casino and a three-deck-high broadway-style theater. Many of the ship's interiors were extensively decorated by muralist Clarissa Parish.

Service history

The ship docked at Blohm und Voss in Hamburg, Germany on 17 April 2006 to repair a damaged bearing in one of the three Azipod propulsion units and some minor modifications prior to her official handover to Royal Caribbean International on 24 April 2006. She then visited Oslo, Norway before sailing for Southampton, England. The ship sailed on its first transatlantic crossing on 3 May 2006.

Freedom of the Seas arrived in New York Harbor, United States, for her official naming ceremony on May 12, 2006 which was broadcast live on NBC's The Today Show from Cape Liberty Cruise Port in Bayonne, New Jersey (the ship's official New York berth), and thereafter traveled to Boston for the weekend of May 19–22. The ship's godmother was selected as Katherine Louise Calder, a Portland, Oregon foster care provider. She began operations out of Miami with her first cruise and maiden voyage on 4 June, sailing to western Caribbean locations.

On 4 May 2009, Freedom of the Seas moved her home port from the Port of Miami-Dade to Port Canaveral. 
The ship underwent her first dry dock refurbishment in March 2011.
In January 2015, the ship underwent another 24-day dry dock. During the dry dock some new interior passenger cabins were added.

In winter 2016, Freedom of the Seas repositioned to Port Everglades, from where she undertook cruises in the Caribbean. After homeporting in Barcelona in the spring and summer of 2017, Freedom of the Seas returned to Port Everglades. In May 2018, she commenced sailing Southern Caribbean sailings out of San Juan, Puerto Rico until April 2021.

Freedom of the Seas underwent a $116 million dry dock in early 2020.

References

External links

 Freedom of the Seas Official Website
 BBC News "Final polish at Germany's Blohm + Voss shipyard"
 Aftenposten Norway "World's largest cruise ship in Oslo"
 BBC News "Massive cruise ship arrives in UK"
 BBC News "Huge cruise ship leaves UK shores"

Ships of Royal Caribbean International
Ships built in Turku
2005 ships